Ponghak station is a railway station in P'yŏngsŏng city, South P'yŏngan Province, North Korea. It is located on the P'yŏngra Line of the Korean State Railway.

References

Railway stations in North Korea